Igor Souza may refer to:

Igor Souza (footballer, born 1979), Brazilian football forward
Igor Souza (footballer, born 2000), Brazilian football defender